The Parliament of Madagascar has two chambers:
The National Assembly ( / ) has 151 members, elected for five-year terms in single-member and two-member constituencies
The Senate ( / ) has 33 members. 22 are elected, one from each district of Madagascar, and 11 more are appointed by the President, all for five-year terms.

See also

Politics of Madagascar
List of legislatures by country

References

External links
National Assembly
Senate

Madagascar
Politics of Madagascar
Political organisations based in Madagascar
Madagascar
Madagascar